Peter Lewis Cowen (born January 1951) is an English ex-professional golfer and golf coach.

Professional golfer
Cowen played on the European Tour in the 1970s and early 1980s with little success. He finished tied for 6th place in the 1980 Cold Shield Greater Manchester Open after a last round 64. He won the Zambia Open in 1976.

Golf coach
As a coach, Cowen's clients include former world number one Lee Westwood, major champions Rory McIlroy, Graeme McDowell, Louis Oosthuizen, Danny Willett, Sergio García, Darren Clarke, Henrik Stenson, Gary Woodland and Brooks Koepka and many other players on both the PGA Tour and European Tour. He has academies in Rotherham, England and in Dubai. He is also senior coach to the English Golf Union. In 2010, he was UK Coach of the Year, an all-sport award.

Professional wins
1976 Zambia Open

Results in major championships

Note: Cowen only played in The Open Championship.

CUT = missed the half way cut (3rd round cut in 1976 Open Championship)
"T" indicates a tie for a place

Team appearances
PGA Cup (representing continental Europe): 1992

References

External links
Official site

English male golfers
European Tour golfers
British golf instructors
1951 births
Living people